Miquel Badia i Capell (1906–1936) was a prominent figure of radical Catalan separatism during the days of the Second Spanish Republic, member of Estat Català and the JEREC, Chief of Public Order of the Generalitat of Catalonia. He became known among his followers as Capità Collons ('Captain Balls').

Biography 
He was born on 10 March 1906 in Torregrossa, in the province of Lleida. He took part in the Catalan separatist initiative that plotted the 1925 failed assassination attempt on King Alfonso XIII. Tortured, he spent a while in the Burgos Prison. After the proclamation of the Second Spanish Republic in April 1931, Badia, an ardent follower of Francesc Macià, became allied to Josep Dencàs; both got to control the JEREC,—youth wing of the newly created Republican Left of Catalonia (ERC)—and its shock squads, the olive green-shirted escamots. Described by Payne as proto-fascists, both Badia and Dencàs talked about the prospect of paving the way for the establishment of ERC as single party of a future Catalan state drawn under a "national" and "socialist" corporative order.

Designated in January 1934 as Secretary General of the Commissariat of Public Order of the Generalitat of Catalonia, he was sacked in March. Lluís Companys appointed Pere Coll i Llach as successor. He was later appointed as Chief of Services of Public Order of the Generalitat on 18 June 1934. In September he ordered the arrest of the prosecutor Manuel Sancho, who was taking part in the trial of Estat Català member Josep M. Xammar, personal friend of Badia. He was forced to resign.

A participant of the armed insurrection against the republican government produced in Catalonia after the entry of three CEDA ministers in the new cabinet presided by Alejandro Lerroux (Events of 6 October), he escaped afterwards and crossed the French-Spain border, settling in Paris. In early 1935, he moved to the Americas (he stood in Colombia and Mexico). He went back to Europe in late 1935, arriving to Nazi Germany on December. He spent some time in Belgium and Andorra. After the win of the Popular Front in the 1936 Spanish general election, he returned to Catalonia already in February 1936 expecting the issuance of an amnesty due to the success of the left-wing coalition, as it finally was the case.

Badia, who had been involved into the heavy hand repression of anarchism during his time with the escamots and at the Generalitat (he acquired a reputation as torturer and killer of anarchists), was assassinated on 28 April 1936 along his brother Josep Badia by FAI gunmen.

References

Bibliography 
 
 
 
 
 
 
 
 

Catalan nationalists
1906 births
1936 deaths
People from Pla d'Urgell
People murdered in Spain
Assassinated Spanish politicians
Deaths by firearm in Spain